Pomponne is a commune in the Seine-et-Marne department in the Île-de-France region in north-central France.

The inhabitants are called Pomponnais.

History

On 23 December 1933, the second worst train accident in France occurred in Pomponne with a rear-end collision of Paris-Nancy express and Paris-Strasbourg fast train. 230 people were killed and 300 injured aboard the Nancy express as its 7 wood coaches were smashed. The driver of the Strasbourg train had passed a signal at danger in darkness and fog, but the "Crocodile" acoustic warning system was found to have failed because the contacts had iced over.

See also
Communes of the Seine-et-Marne department

References

External links

Official site 
1999 Land Use, from IAURIF (Institute for Urban Planning and Development of the Paris-Île-de-France région) 

Communes of Seine-et-Marne